Ivesia muirii is a species of flowering plant in the rose family known by the common name granite mousetail. It is endemic to the High Sierra Nevada of California, where it grows on rocky slopes and cliffs.

This is a small perennial herb growing in tufts of erect leaves and stems. The leaf is 2 to 5 centimeters long and is made up of many densely hairy overlapping leaflets such that the leaf is a cylindrical, pointed, whitish to silvery body. The mostly naked stem is up to 15 centimeters long and holds an inflorescence of clustered flowers. Each flower is about half a centimeter wide, with triangular sepals covered in long, white hairs. Between the sepals are narrow, pointed petals of bright yellow. In the center of the flower are a few stamens and pistils. The fruit is an achene about two millimeters long which is gray with reddish spots.

External links
Jepson Manual Treatment
Photo gallery

muirii
Endemic flora of California
Flora of the Sierra Nevada (United States)
Flora without expected TNC conservation status